HMS Monck was a 52-gun third rate frigate built for the navy of the Commonwealth of England at Portsmouth, and launched in 1659. She retained her name after the Restoration of the monarchy in 1660. By 1677 her armament had been increased to 60 guns.

Monck was rebuilt at Greenland South Dockyard, Rotherhithe in 1702 as a 60-gun fourth rate ship of the line. She was wrecked in 1720.

Notes

References

Lavery, Brian (2003) The Ship of the Line - Volume 1: The development of the battlefleet 1650-1850. Conway Maritime Press. .

Ships of the line of the Royal Navy
1650s ships
Ships built in Portsmouth
Ships built in Rotherhithe
Maritime incidents in 1720